Potassium propanoate or potassium propionate has formula K(C2H5COO). Its melting point is 410 °C. It is the potassium salt of propanoic acid.

Use
It is used as a food preservative and is represented by the food labeling E number E283 in Europe and by the INS number 283 in Australia and New Zealand.

References 

Propionates
Potassium compounds
E-number additives